Lenart v Slovenskih Goricah is a town in the Slovene Hills in the Municipality of Lenart in northeastern Slovenia. The area is part of the traditional region of Styria. It is now included in the Drava Statistical Region. It is the seat of the municipality.

Name
The name of the settlement was changed from Sveti Lenart v Slovenskih goricah (literally, 'Saint Leonard in the Slovene Hills') to Lenart v Slovenskih goricah (literally, 'Leonard in the Slovene Hills') in 1952. The name was changed on the basis of the 1948 Law on Names of Settlements and Designations of Squares, Streets, and Buildings as part of efforts by Slovenia's postwar communist government to remove religious elements from toponyms.

Notable people
Notable people that were born or lived in Lenart v Slovenskih Goricah include:
Vito Kraigher (1911–1945), communist politician

References

External links
Lenart v Slovenskih Goricah on Geopedia

Populated places in the Municipality of Lenart